Gradsteinia is a genus of moss in family Amblystegiaceae. 

The genus name of Gradsteinia is in honour of Stephan Robbert Gradstein (b.1943) a Dutch botanist (Bryology) and Professor of Botany
at the University of Göttingen.

The genus was circumscribed by Ryszard Ochyra in Trop. Bryol. vol.3 on page 19 in 1990.

It contains the following species (but this list may be incomplete), Gradsteinia torrenticola, Ochyra, C.Schmidt & Bültmann

References

Hypnales
Moss genera
Taxonomy articles created by Polbot